Andover Football Club was an association football club based in Andover, Hampshire, established in 1883. Since the 2007–08 season, Andover had been a member of the Southern League Division One South and West at Step 4 of the National League System (i.e. four divisions below the English Football League). The club played at this level for 29 of its 128 years of existence, and played its thousandth game in this league in 2008. Compared with earlier periods, the ten years from 1998 to 2008 were relatively successful for Andover, seeing them win a number of league and cup honours as well as registering their biggest ever win.

In the 2010–11 season, the club finished twenty-first out of twenty-one teams, and was dissolved in July 2011 due to continuing financial constraints. In a statement announcing the matter, club secretary Graham Cousins expressed a hope that the club could "be resurrected to play at a more appropriate level" in the future. A new club, Andover Lions F.C. was subsequently formed and played in the Hampshire Premier League until February 2017.

History

Early years
Andover Football Club was formed in 1883 and played their first game on 27 October at Stride's Field, Weyhill Road, a friendly match against Basingstoke Mechanical Engineers. Three years later they moved to the Walled Meadow, where they played their home matches for the next 96 years. For most of the next thirty years, the club competed in three separate small leagues which were run side by side during the space of each season; the Hampshire League, the Salisbury and District League, and the North Hants May League. During this time, Andover won the Salisbury League eight times, the North Hants May League five times and reached the Hampshire Junior Cup final twice.

Andover competed in the first Hampshire Senior Cup in 1888, but became involved in controversy after they were knocked out of the competition by Woolston Works. During this match, a Glasgow–based player called J. Kesson played for Woolston in their victory. Andover protested that Kesson should be disqualified on the grounds of residency—although he had played for Woolston Works earlier that season, he had since moved back to Glasgow. Woolston's appeal rested on the fact that Kesson had left some items of clothing at his lodgings in Woolston, and this should be interpreted as his intention to return. The Hampshire FA upheld the appeal, allowing Woolston to progress through to the next round and eventually win the inaugural competition.

Andover joined the newly formed Southern League Second Division South West section in 1898. They won just two of their ten games at this higher level and finished bottom of their six-team division, which also included Cowes, Ryde and Eastleigh. After just one season, they moved back down to county league football along with the majority of teams in that division.

1900 to the Second World War
Until the First World War Andover played in the Hampshire League North Division (the Hampshire League at this time was composed of a number of regional divisions instead of the present-day hierarchical structure), and their first major honour came in 1913–14 when they won that division. Competition was suspended during the war, and upon the restart they rejoined the Hampshire League in the North Division before moving to an enlarged County Division in the 1920–21 season. It was while in this division that they won their most prestigious title to date, the league championship in 1924–25.

Division One of the Hampshire League was formed at the start of the 1929–30 season, and Andover were almost permanent members of that division, winning their first title in 1934–35. The only slip was in 1936–37 when they were relegated, but they returned the following year after winning promotion from Division Two. The club remained active during the Second World War, winning the Hampshire League title in 1944–45.

Andover had a certain degree of success in county cup competitions during this period. They reached the final of the Hampshire Senior Cup twice, in 1931 and 1933, losing to Winchester City and Newport (IOW) respectively. They also won the Russell Cotes Cup four times and reached the final a further three times.

Post-war Years
Andover continued playing in Division One of the Hampshire League after the war. They had success during the period between 1948 and 1951, winning two more Hampshire League championships as well as winning the Hampshire Senior Cup for the first two times in the club's history. In 1960–61, Andover won the Russell Cotes Cup for the sixth time, while the reserves were champions of Division Two and won the County Intermediate Cup for the second successive season. The following year saw the first team win their eighth Hampshire League championship and retain the Russell Cotes Cup, while the Reserves were champions of Division Two again. Ian Henderson broke his own goalscoring record set the previous year, scoring 62 goals.

In 1962, the club followed Salisbury and stepped up to the Western League. This proved to be quite a different challenge—whereas before they had only competed against local teams in league competition, they now faced opposition from teams as far afield as Avon, Somerset and Devon as well as the reserve teams of league clubs such as Bristol Rovers, Bristol City and Torquay United. They generally fared well, only failing to finish in the top half of the table twice during their time at this level. Their first season in the Western League saw the club reach the first round proper of the FA Cup for the only time in their history after defeating Hendon 5–4 in a fourth qualifying round replay. On 3 November, Fourth Division side Gillingham came to the Walled Meadow and won 1–0 in front of 3484 spectators, a figure which would remain as the club's largest attendance for a home game. In the league Andover finished fourth, but that was their highest placing until 1969–70 when they finished as runners-up.

This was repeated the following season, and so in 1971 Andover took another step up and joined the Southern League. Now competing against teams from an even wider area spanning almost the entire width of the country (ranging from Bideford in the west to Bury Town in the east) and in some cases with a larger budget and fanbase, competition was always tough with the club generally finishing in the bottom half of the table. The highest position the club reached at this level was the sixth place reached in 1987–88 and again in 1991–92.

Move to the Portway Stadium
In 1989 the Walled Meadow was sold for redevelopment and the club moved to the brand new Portway Stadium, which is located on the West Portway Industrial Estate. A crowd of 1,100 watched the official opening match against Leicester City, with the league team coming away with a 10–1 victory. After much deliberation over the cost and distance of travel involved in Southern League football, the club voluntarily stepped down the pyramid ladder to join the Wessex League in 1993–94.

The first season saw them finish runners-up, but the club's management declined to apply for promotion back into the Southern League and so they remained in the Wessex League. In the following three seasons they were placed seventh, ninth and sixth, but 1997–98 saw the club finish runners-up again, winning promotion back to the Southern League. Returning after a five-year absence, it was not long before the difference in quality between the two leagues became evident, and the club soon realised that it was unable to compete financially with the bigger clubs in the division. At the beginning of the year the club announced its intention to return to the Wessex League for 1999–2000, a decision taken because it was felt it would be better to play in a league in which it could compete financially and successfully.

2000 to 2011
The next few years saw Andover enjoying its most successful spell for many decades. The first season back in the Wessex League saw the club finish third. They also reached the final of the Hampshire Senior Cup for the first time in 35 years, losing 1–9 to Aldershot Town in what is the Shots' record win in their current incarnation. The team scored a total of 233 goals in all competitions, including a club record 88 goals scored by Andy Forbes.

Andover won the Wessex League championship for the first time in the 2000–01 season, scoring a club record 153 league goals including a 14–1 win over Swanage Town & Herston, the club's record victory. In addition, they won the Hampshire Senior Cup for the fifth time in the club's history, beating Havant & Waterlooville 2–0 at The Dell. They also retained the North Hants Senior Cup to complete a treble.

They retained the League title the following year, winning the championship by a single point from Fleet Town following a 1–1 draw at Fleet on the last day of the season—this match was played in front of 623 people, a record attendance for a Wessex League match up to that date. The Lions gained another treble by also winning the League Cup and Russell Cotes Cup. The club won the North Hants Senior Cup again in 2002–03, and reached the semi-finals of both the Hampshire Senior Cup and the Russell Cotes Cup. Another Wessex League attendance record was set towards the end of the season when 702 people saw Andover's 6–1 win over Eastleigh.

Despite this period of success, the club failed to attract significant local support. The club was close to extinction during the summer of 2003 after the chairman resigned, and was only saved when twelve supporters secured its future by purchasing the lease for the Portway Stadium from the outgoing chairman. The 2003–04 season brought success in the FA Vase competition, when Andover reached the quarterfinals for the first time in their history, before losing to Hampshire rivals Winchester City. They finished sixth in the league and won the North Hants Senior Cup for the fifth time. The 2004–05 season saw an improvement in the league with a fifth-place finish; the reserves finished runners up in the Wessex Combination East division. The club also won the North Hants Senior Cup for the sixth time.

Under the 2006 pyramid reorganisations, a third-place finish in the Wessex League was good enough for promotion back to the Southern League, along with local rivals Winchester City and Thatcham Town. In their first season back, they finished in ninth place, just five points from the divisional playoffs. They were unable to build on this and struggled to a nineteenth-place finish in the following season, ultimately finishing 29 points above relegation after Slough Town were reprieved following Halifax Town's expulsion from the Football Conference. Andover's home match against Uxbridge, played towards the end of that season, was the club's thousandth game in the Southern League.

The beginning of the 2008–09 season saw the Lions marking their 125th anniversary with a pre-season friendly against local rivals Salisbury City. Prior to the game, it had been announced that the club would also be wearing a new kit design to mark this occasion for one season only—a plain red shirt (a departure from the traditional red and black stripes) was worn for the first time during this game, which Andover won 3–2. The season itself saw Andover have their best run in the FA Trophy to date, eventually losing 0–3 at home to Newport County in the third qualifying round.

The start of the 2010–11 season was disrupted due to damage caused to the Portway Stadium pitch by rabbits, leading to a number of home league games being postponed. An FA Cup match against Chertsey Town was played at Whitchurch United's Longmeadow Ground, and their FA Trophy match against Bideford was played at Winchester City's Denplan City Ground. The Lions were unable to recover and struggled throughout the season, failing to win a single home game and finishing bottom of the division with eleven points after conceding more than 100 goals. However, the club avoided relegation due to the resignation of Almondsbury Town F.C. earlier in the season.

Dissolution & Reformation
Following the 2010–11 season, a new chairman and manager were appointed by the club. However, the manager resigned shortly afterwards to take up a post at Rotherham United F.C., and the chairman resigned citing continuing financial constraints. The remaining board members formally wound up the club and resigned from the Southern League in July 2011.

A new club named Andover Lions F.C. was formed two weeks later. After gaining clearance from the Football Association and the Hampshire F.A., the club were accepted into the Hampshire League 2004 (where the original club's reserve side had been playing) in time for the start of the 2011–12 season, with home games played at the Charlton Sports Centre. The Lions progressed on the Hampshire Premier League but sadly withdrew and folded midway through the 2016–17 season.

Honours

Ground

Previously, the club played at the Walled Meadow, near to the town centre. The ground had a main wooden stand along one side (which incorporated the changing rooms), and a bank of covered terracing on the opposite side. The ground was mainly accessed via the car park off London Road, with turnstiles also situated on Eastfield Road behind the main stand. Since the club left the Walled Meadow in 1989, the ground has been demolished and the site is now used for a housing development of the same name.

In 1989 the club moved to the Portway Stadium, situated in the Portway Industrial Estate on the western outskirts of the town. Built at a cost of £850,000, the ground has a main stand of brick and concrete construction with bench seating for around 250 people. This stand is set on a bank running along the entire south side of the ground, giving spectators on that side an elevated view of the pitch. The managers' benches are set into this banking in front of the stand at pitch level. The banking slopes down behind each goal until it reaches the same level as the pitch along the north side. There is hard standing around the entire perimeter of pitch, along with a turnstile block and a gate opening out onto the stadium car park for ambulance access.

The stadium's clubhouse (named the Portway Suite) is also situated on this elevated side, just inside the turnstiles. The clubhouse houses a function suite and bar at first-floor level, and changing rooms, physio room, public announcement equipment, toilets and a tea bar at ground-floor level.

In addition to hosting the club's first, reserve and youth team fixtures, the Portway Stadium has also played host to a number of local and regional cup matches. They include Hampshire Senior Cup semi-finals, Hampshire Floodlit Youth Cup finals, and the South West Counties Women's Championship playoff final.

Following the demise of Andover F.C. in 2011, the stadium was unused for 2 years until the newly formed Andover Town won the lease for its use and, after a major facelift, regular football returned to the venue with the newly established outfit gaining direct entry into the Wessex League First Division where they gained promotion after their first season.

Supporters

In the 2008–09 season, Andover's average attendance was 149, representing a small increase of three compared to the previous season. This figure was the 11th highest in the division, falling around twenty short of the division's mean average.

Attendance levels at Andover's matches reached a peak in the late 1960s. During the 1969–70 season, home attendances at league matches averaged over 550, with the largest crowd being the 2,144 people who watched their FA Cup match against local rivals Salisbury. In the years following their promotion to the Southern League, average attendances started to drop until they dipped below the 200 mark during the 1970s. Since then, the average attendance at Andover's matches has remained at approximately 140, although this figure dipped below 100 in the 1999–2000 season following their last relegation from the Southern League. Just three seasons later however, this figure had risen to just under 200 following the club's second consecutive Wessex League championship and successes in cup competitions.

Rivalries
Traditionally, Andover's supporters regarded Salisbury as their local rivals, with matches between the two teams often attracting larger attendances than average for Andover's home games. This rivalry was encouraged by the fact that the two teams played in the same division for all but three years between Andover's admission into the Western League in 1962 and their step down to the Wessex League in 1992. With Salisbury City's rise up the football pyramid separating the two teams, the nearest club in Andover's division was Whitchurch United, until Winchester City were promoted from the Hampshire League in 2003. Their rivalry quickly grew and was at its closest during that season's FA Vase competition, in which the two clubs were drawn against each other at the quarter-final stage. This rivalry continued following the two teams' simultaneous promotion to the Southern Football League in 2006.

Andover New Street, a Wessex League team who play just outside the town, were also considered rivals. The two teams competed in an annual pre-season tournament known as the Dango Memorial Cup (a charity tournament named in honour of a former player who appeared for both teams), together with two other invited clubs.

Colours & Crest

Andover's traditional strip of red and black stripes was worn for the vast majority of their history. This was changed to red and black quarters in 1950 and remained so until 1957 when the club reverted to the traditional stripes. When promotion to the Southern League was gained in 1972, the team's colours were changed, this time to red with a single white stripe. This kit was worn until 1988, when the familiar red and black stripes were re-introduced. For the 2008–09 season, a plain red kit was introduced to commemorate the club's 125th anniversary—this was worn for the first time in the pre-season friendly against Salisbury City. The last away kit worn by the team was yellow and black shirts with white shorts. However, various combinations have been worn in recent years, such as white shirts with blue sleeves and blue shorts, and tangerine shirts with white shorts.

Andover's badge depicted a lion standing under an oak tree, which mirrors the design used on the town coat of arms. This badge was first used during the 1950s.

Playing records

Best league performance: Sixth in Southern League Southern Division, 1987–88 and 1991–92
Best FA Cup performance: First round, 1962–63
Best FA Trophy performance: Third qualifying round, 2008–09
Best FA Vase performance: Quarter-finals (sixth round), 2003–04
Highest Scorer in a Season: Andy Forbes, 86 goals in 1999–2000
Worst Defeat: 0–24 vs. Ryde Sports, Hampshire League, 27 January 1900
Record attendances:
Walled Meadow: 3,484 vs. Gillingham, FA Cup first round, 3 November 1962
Portway Stadium: 1,183 vs. Portsmouth XI, friendly

Record victories

League History 1896–2011

FA Cup

FA Trophy

FA Vase

Finances & Structure

Prior to its dissolution, Andover Football Club was run as a Private Limited Company. The twelve-man consortium who took over the club in 2003 were the club shareholders, with the club president being the majority shareholder, the club chairman holding the second-largest number of shares, and the remainder of the shares distributed equally among the other members of the board and management committee.

Andover were sponsored by a number of local companies including the Hospital Saving Association (HSA), a locally based health insurance firm who have also sponsored Blackburn Rovers in the past.

In addition to gate receipts, the club derived income from club merchandise sold in the club shop, and the Portway Suite (the clubhouse at the Portway Stadium). The suite was able to be rented out for private events such as wedding receptions and birthday parties as well as hosting club events such as quiz nights. A boardroom was also available for conferences and meetings.

Former players

Despite their relatively low stature, a few notable players have represented Andover FC in the past. The most famous of these in recent times is Nigel Spackman, a local player who began his career for his home town before moving to AFC Bournemouth in 1980. From there, he enjoyed a successful career culminating in an English league championship win with Liverpool, and numerous Scottish league and cup winners medals with Rangers. Since retiring, he has ventured into club management as well as becoming a television football pundit.

Like Spackman, Bill Rawlings was another Andoverian who began his career at the club. He joined Southampton in 1919 where he enjoyed a successful career scoring 175 goals in 327 league appearances, making him their third all-time goalscorer behind Mick Channon and Matthew Le Tissier. He earned two England caps in 1922 against Wales and Scotland respectively. He also played for Manchester United and Port Vale.

Dick Rowley was signed in September 1922 by Andover whilst serving at nearby Tidworth army base. After a few years playing the wing for the club, he was signed by Swindon Town and went on to play for Southampton, Tottenham Hotspur and Preston North End. He won six caps for Ireland in the years between 1929 and 1931, scoring two goals against Scotland and Wales.

Another league player who started his career for Andover is James Sharp who left Andover in 2000 to play for Hartlepool United. Since then, he has had spells at Falkirk, Torquay United, Rochdale and Airdrie United in the Scottish League.

However, it has often been the case that league players have joined Andover after retiring from professional football. One of the most notable of these in modern times is Matt Crossley, who ended his career with the Lions after playing more than 100 matches for Wycombe Wanderers. After leaving Andover in 2001, Crossley later became assistant manager at Woking where he gained notoriety in December 2006 after he headbutted an opposing player who had tried to break up a fight. Maurice Evans is another former professional who, after briefly taking over as Andover's player-manager in 1967, went on to lead Reading to the Fourth Division championship, and Oxford United to Milk Cup victory.

Another such player is Nicky Banger who played for Andover in their Wessex League championship winning team of 2002, the Lions being one of a string of local non-league clubs that he played for after leaving professional football. Mel Blyth, who was on Southampton's 1976 FA Cup winning team, ended his career with Andover in 1982. His cup final team-mate David Peach also played for Andover, this time in the 1983–84 season when he scored five goals for the club. Other ex-league players who have represented Andover in the past include Colin Barrett (who joined Andover in 1981 after playing league football for Manchester City, Nottingham Forest and Swindon Town), Stuart Barfoot, Peter Brown, and former player-coach Phil Andrews.

Other Teams & Activities
Andover's reserve team played for most of the club's history in various competitions and won the Hampshire Combination in 1998, although they did not play during the 2007–08 season. The reserve team competed in the Hampshire League 2004 from 2008 to 2011 (later to become Andover Lions). In addition to their first and reserve teams, Andover FC also ran a number of youth teams; an under-18s team competing in the North East Hampshire Youth League, and teams for other age groups ranging from under-7s to under-15s. The under-18s also competed in the FA Youth Cup.

In July 2008, the club started a community programme called "Lions in the Community" in conjunction with some of their principal sponsors (such as HSA and Stannah Lifts) and a government body to provide a range of football activities for children and schools in the immediate area. Events held included coaching sessions at schools and local sports centres, five-a-side football tournaments for girls' teams from local secondary schools, fun days and after-school clubs. As a result of this programme, the club was officially awarded FA Charter Community Club status in October 2009. Despite the dissolution of Andover F.C., the Lions in the Community programme continues its activities.

References

External links
Official Club Website
Official Lions in the Community website
Andover FC Unofficial Archive Site

 
Defunct football clubs in England
Defunct football clubs in Hampshire
Western Football League
Southern Football League clubs
Wessex Football League
Association football clubs established in 1883
Association football clubs disestablished in 2011
Andover, Hampshire
1883 establishments in England
2011 disestablishments in England